The Petition Movement for the Establishment of a Taiwanese Parliament (or alternatively translated ... Taiwan Representative Assembly, Taiwan Parliament Petition League Movement) took place in the first half of the twentieth century. It  demanded that the Imperial Diet of Japan establish a self-governing parliament, or representative assembly, in Taiwan. Started by New People Society of Taiwan, this movement marked a transition in Taiwanese colonial politics, from armed resistance to modern political movement. It was the longest political movement during the Japanese occupation period of Taiwan..

The movement was led by Rin Kendō of the Taiwanese Cultural Association, who founded the League for the Establishment of a Formosan Parliament in 1923. The group delivered their last petition in 1934, without accomplishing their goal. Limited local elections were held in 1935.

References

See also
Great Petition

External links

 

Taiwan under Japanese rule
Identity politics in Taiwan
Taishō period
Taiwan in World War II